In mathematical optimization, linear-fractional programming (LFP) is a generalization of linear programming (LP). Whereas the objective function in a linear program is a linear function, the objective function in a linear-fractional program is a ratio of two linear functions. A linear program can be regarded as a special case of a linear-fractional program in which the denominator is the constant function one.

Relation to linear programming
Both linear programming and linear-fractional programming represent optimization problems using linear equations and linear inequalities, which for each problem-instance define a feasible set. Fractional linear programs have a richer set of objective functions. Informally, linear programming computes a policy delivering the best outcome, such as maximum profit or lowest cost. In contrast, a linear-fractional programming is used to achieve the highest ratio of outcome to cost, the ratio representing the highest efficiency. For example, in the context of LP we maximize the objective function profit = income − cost and might obtain maximum profit of $100 (= $1100 of income − $1000 of cost). Thus, in LP we have an efficiency of $100/$1000 = 0.1. Using LFP we might obtain an efficiency of $10/$50 = 0.2 with a profit of only $10, but only requiring $50 of investment.

Definition
Formally, a linear-fractional program is defined as the problem of maximizing (or minimizing) a ratio of affine functions over a polyhedron,

Alternatively, the denominator of the objective function has to be strictly negative in the entire feasible region.

Transformation to a linear program
Under the assumption that the feasible region is non-empty and bounded, the Charnes-Cooper transformation

translates the linear-fractional program above to the equivalent linear program:

Duality
Then the dual of the LFP above is 

which is an LP and which coincides with the dual of the equivalent linear program resulting from the Charnes-Cooper transformation.

Properties and algorithms
The objective function in a linear-fractional problem is both quasiconcave and quasiconvex (hence quasilinear) with a monotone property, pseudoconvexity, which is a stronger property than quasiconvexity. A linear-fractional objective function is both pseudoconvex and pseudoconcave, hence pseudolinear. Since an LFP can be transformed to an LP, it can be solved using any LP solution method, such as the simplex algorithm (of George B. Dantzig), the criss-cross algorithm, or interior-point methods.

Notes

References

Further reading

Software
WinGULF – educational interactive linear and linear-fractional programming solver with a lot of special options (pivoting, pricing, branching variables, etc.)
JOptimizer – Java convex optimization library (open source)

Optimization algorithms and methods
Linear programming
Generalized convexity